Pietro Grosso (23 December 1923 – 3 October 1957) was an Italian professional footballer who played as a midfielder.

Club career
Gross played for 11 seasons (337 games, 1 goal) in the Italian Serie A with Vicenza Calcio, U.S. Triestina Calcio, A.C. Milan, A.S. Roma and A.C. Torino.

International career
Gross made his Italy national football team debut on 25 November 1951 in a game against Switzerland.

External links
 

1923 births
1957 deaths
Italian footballers
Italy international footballers
Serie A players
Treviso F.B.C. 1993 players
L.R. Vicenza players
U.S. Triestina Calcio 1918 players
A.C. Milan players
A.S. Roma players
Torino F.C. players
Brescia Calcio players
Association football midfielders
People from Roncade